Fiorano may refer to:

 Fiorano Modenese, comune in Italy
 Fiorano (wine), Italian wine producing estate in Latium owned by prince Alberico Boncompagni Ludovisi
 Fiorano Circuit, test circuit owned and utilized by Ferrari located on the outskirts of Fiorano Modenese
 The Ferrari 599 GTB Fiorano, 2 seater GT sports car built by Ferrari, named for the circuit